Repče is a small settlement in the hills above Šmarje-Sap in central Slovenia. It belongs to the City Municipality of Ljubljana. It is part of the traditional region of Lower Carniola and is now included with the rest of the municipality in the Central Slovenia Statistical Region.

Name
Repče was attested in historical sources as Ressicz in 1444 and Reptsch in 1496.

References

External links
Repče on Geopedia

Populated places in the City Municipality of Ljubljana
Sostro District